The 1994 United States Senate election in Minnesota was held November 8, 1994. Incumbent Republican U.S. Senator David Durenberger decided to retire instead of seeking a third full term. Republican Rod Grams won the open seat. , this was the last time the Republicans won the Class 1 Senate seat from Minnesota.

Major candidates

DFL 
 Ann Wynia, former State Representative

Independence 
 Dean Barkley, attorney

Republican 
 Rod Grams, U.S. Representative

Results

See also 
 1994 United States Senate elections

References 

1994
Minnesota
1994 Minnesota elections